Anne-Marie Miéville (born 11 November 1945) is a Swiss video and filmmaker whom Sight & Sound has called a "hugely important multimedia artist."

Biography
Miéville was a practising photographer when she met Jean-Luc Godard, who would become her companion (and later husband), in Paris in 1970. From 1973 until 1994, she collaborated with Godard as photographer, scriptwriter, film editor, co-director, assuming the role of artistic director on some of their projects. In 1983, she realized her first short film How can I love; her second, The Book of Mary (Le livre de Marie), followed one year later. The Book of Mary is featured in the DVD release of Godard's Hail Mary (1985).

Works
In 2002, Miéville wrote Images en parole, a set of short texts published by Léo Scheer, who wrote that they are "a continuation of static shots, short films of the writing. It is not strictly speaking about novels, but rather of unspeakable moments, escaped flavours of images, where it would be a question of filming with words".

As a director

 1976 : Six fois deux/Sur et sous la communication (TV series)
 1976 : Here and Elsewhere
 1977 : France/tour/detour/deux/enfants (TV series)
 1978 : Comment ça va?
 1983 : How Can I Love
 1984 : Le Livre de Marie
 1986 : Soft and Hard
 1986 : Faire la fête
 1988: My Dear Subject
 1989 : Le Rapport Darty
 1990 : Comment vont les enfants
 1991 : Contre l'oubli (documentary constituted by thirty short films of three minutes for thirty cases of Amnesty International).
 1994 : Lou n'a pas dit non (inspired by correspondence between Lou Andreas Salomé and Rainer Maria Rilke)
 1995 : Deux fois cinquante ans de cinéma français
 1997 : Nous sommes tous encore ici
 1998 : The Old Place
 2000 : Après la réconciliation
 2002 : Liberté et patrie

As a screenwriter

 1975 : Numéro deux
 1976 : Six fois deux/Sur et sous la communication (TV series)
 1976 : Here and Elsewhere
 1977 : France/tour/detour/deux/enfants (TV series)
 1978 : Comment ça va?
 1980: Every Man for Himself 
 1985 : Détective
 1986 : Faire la fête
 1988: My Dear Subject
 1994 : Lou n'a pas dit non
 1997 : Nous sommes tous encore ici
 2000 : Après la réconciliation
 2002 : Liberté et patrie
 2002 : Ten Minutes Older: The Cello

As editor

 1976 : Six fois deux/Sur et sous la communication (TV series)
 1976 : Here and Elsewhere
 1980: Every Man for Himself 
 1985: Hail Mary
 1986 : Faire la fête
 1988: My Dear Subject
 1995 : Deux fois cinquante ans de cinéma français
 2000 : Après la réconciliation
 2002 : Liberté et patrie

References

External links
 

1945 births
Living people
Swiss film directors
Swiss women film directors
Swiss screenwriters
People from Lausanne